Robert H. Krieble (August 22, 1916 – May 8, 1997) was a chemist who co-founded the Loctite Corporation in 1953 (with his father, 
Vernon K. Krieble) and was a leading figure in the company in various capacities until 1986, having served as chief executive from 1964 to 1985. Krieble served on the board of the Heritage Foundation from 1978 (becoming vice chairman in 1985) and on the board of the Free Congress Foundation. He also formed the Krieble Institute in 1989, "to promote democracy and economic freedom in the Soviet Union and Eastern Europe". In the service of the Institute "he made more than 80 trips over there, conducting seminars, meeting with leaders and training a full-time network of over 20,000 field experts to establish political economic reform." In 1990 he was named by President George H. W. Bush to the Executive Committee of the Citizens Democracy Corps.

Krieble had a chemistry degree from Haverford College (1935) and a doctorate from Johns Hopkins University (1939). After several years at the Socony Vacuum Oil Company, he joined General Electric in 1943. "Mr. Krieble remained with General Electric, rising from research chemist to general manager of the chemical development department, until he left in 1956 to work full time at Loctite."

The Heritage Foundation runs a "Robert H. Krieble Lecture" series in his honor, and since 1998 provides a "Robert H. Krieble Fellow in Coalition Relations" based on an endowment by Krieble's family. Krieble donated about $100,000 a year to Heritage for almost a decade.

Krieble was awarded a "Freedom Flame" award by the Center for Security Policy in 1994.

References

External links
 Dave Dunn, Legends Of The Industry: Dr. Robert Krieble, Adhesives Magazine, January 1, 2006

1916 births
1997 deaths
Haverford College alumni
Johns Hopkins University alumni
20th-century American chemists
20th-century American businesspeople